Mary Creegan Roark (September 1, 1861 – February 1, 1922) was the first female President and second ever President of Eastern Kentucky State Normal School, later becoming Eastern Kentucky University, from April 1909 until March 1910. Roark held this position following the death of her husband, Ruric Nevel Roark, in 1909. Roark led the university at a time when women did not have the right to vote in state or federal elections. Roark was involved in the Suffrage Movement for Equal Rights and was elected Secretary of the Kentucky Equal Rights Association in 1898. Her stances included better teacher training and salaries, she also helped gain the right to vote in school elections. Roark died in Baltimore, Maryland on February 1, 1922 and is buried in Richmond, Kentucky at the Richmond Cemetery.

Education 
Roark attended Nebraska University, Oberlin College, and the National Normal University to obtain her Bachelor's of Science and Art and then her teaching certification from the National Normal University located in Lebanon, Ohio.

Educational Leadership 
She taught for four years at the National Normal University before she married a former student, Ruric Nevel Roark, on July 31, 1881. They then moved to Glasgow, Kentucky where they served as principal and vice-principal at the Normal School in Glasgow from 1885 until 1889.

Political Office and Clubwork 
They moved to Lexington, Kentucky where Ruric N. Roark was the new dean of the Normal School Department at the Kentucky State College (now University of Kentucky). They lived very near campus on South Limestone Street, and in 1895 she won a seat on the Lexington School Board for her ward in the first year that Lexington women could vote for that office.  She started the Lexington chapter of the prestigious Sorosis woman's club, serving as its president for as long as she lived there. She was also a charter member of the Woman's Club of Central Kentucky founded in 1894. She was elected corresponding secretary for the Kentucky Equal Rights Association (KERA) in 1898, and continued there in various posts until 1911. She was elected chair of the Education Committee of the Kentucky Federation of Women's Clubs in 1902. In 1903 she chaired the committee that organized the Woman's Council for the Lexington Chautauqua program that summer.

Eastern Kentucky University 
In 1906 Ruric N. Roark was appointed as the first president of Eastern Kentucky Normal School, now known as Eastern Kentucky University. When he was diagnosed with brain cancer in April 1909, his wife Mary was then appointed as the first female president of the university until John Grant Crabbe, the Kentucky superintendent of public education at the time, took her position in March 1910. Crabbe was succeeded by Thomas Jackson Coates. Roark signed the diplomas of the first ever graduating class of EKU in 1909. After passing the torch of president, Mary became the Dean of Women at EKU and served until 1915, leaving due to health concerns. Enrollment at EKU increased 25% during Roark's tenure as she helped Appalachian students attend the college and established the all-female residence hall. On February 2, 2015, the Eastern Kentucky Board of Regents officially named Mary Roark the 2nd President of the University.

Further accomplishments 
 Taught four years at National Normal University
 Vice-President of Glasgow Normal School for three years
 Served on the Lexington, Kentucky school board
 Member of the State Education Commission for two years
 Written and read papers before the Southern Educational Association , State Educational Association and the Conference of Education in South
 Member of the National Educational Association Southern Educational Association
 Member of the Woman's Club
 Member of Suffrage Club

References 

1861 births
1922 deaths
People from Washington County, Iowa
University of Nebraska–Lincoln alumni
Oberlin College alumni
National Normal University alumni
Western Kentucky University faculty
Presidents of Eastern Kentucky University